Jürgen Werner may refer to:

 Jürgen Werner (footballer, born 1935) (1935–2002), German football player
 Jürgen Werner (footballer, born 1961), Austrian football player
 Jürgen Werner (footballer, born 1967), Austrian football player
 Jürgen Werner (cyclist), German road cyclist